Wandsworth Bridge crosses the River Thames in west London. It carries the A217 road between the area of Battersea, near Wandsworth Town Station, in the London Borough of Wandsworth on the south of the river, and the areas of Sands End and Parsons Green, in the London Borough of Hammersmith and Fulham, on the north side.

The first bridge on the site was a toll bridge built by Julian Tolmé in 1873, in the expectation that the western terminus of the Hammersmith and City Railway would shortly be built on the north bank, leading to a sharp increase in the number of people wanting to cross the river at this point. The railway terminus was not built, and problems with drainage on the approach road made access to the bridge difficult for vehicles. Wandsworth Bridge was commercially unsuccessful, and in 1880 it was taken into public ownership and made toll-free. Tolmé's bridge was narrow and too weak to carry buses, and in 1926 a Royal Commission recommended its replacement.

In 1937 Tolmé's bridge was demolished. The present bridge, an unadorned steel cantilever bridge designed by Sir Thomas Peirson Frank, was opened in 1940. At the time of its opening it was painted in dull shades of blue as camouflage against air raids, a colour scheme it retains. Although Wandsworth Bridge is one of the busiest bridges in London, carrying over 50,000 vehicles daily, it has been described as "probably the least noteworthy bridge in London".

Background
Although opposite each other across the River Thames, Fulham on the north bank and Wandsworth on the south bank were historically isolated from each other; the nearest crossing points were at Putney Bridge to the west and Battersea Bridge to the east, both over a mile from Wandsworth. The fast flowing but narrow River Wandle at Wandsworth was well-situated for driving watermills, leading to the rapid spread of industry in the area during the 19th century. Nearby Battersea Railway Bridge opened in 1863, but as the local population grew and London's built-up area began to encroach during the 19th century, pressure from local residents and businesses for a road bridge to be built increased.

In 1864, it was expected that the newly formed Hammersmith and City Railway would build its western terminus on the north bank of the river between Chelsea and Fulham. Rowland Mason Ordish designed an Ordish–Lefeuvre Principle bridge to comply with the Act's specifications, of a similar design to his nearby Albert Bridge. Wandsworth Bridge and Albert Bridge were authorised on the same day, the last private tollbridges authorised in London.

1873 bridge

Ordish was asked to design a cheaper bridge to the new specifications but refused to change the design, so Julian Tolmé was appointed designer in his place. Tolmé designed a starkly functional lattice truss bridge of wrought iron. It cost £40,000 (about £ in ) to build, and consisted of five identical spans, supported by four pairs of concrete-filled iron piers; each of the cylindrical piers was sunk  into the riverbed. The bridge was due to open in early 1873, but the workmen building it went on strike, and a third Act of Parliament was necessary to give the company time to resolve the dispute and complete the project.

Wandsworth Bridge was formally opened in a small ceremony on 26 September 1873, and a celebratory buffet was provided at the nearby Spread Eagle pub. A utilitarian structure made of mismatched materials purchased for cheapness, the new bridge elicited unenthusiastic responses; the Illustrated London News remarked at the time of its opening that "No attempt has been made to produce architectural effect, the structure being substantial rather than ornamental". A d toll was charged on pedestrians, and carts were charged 6d.

In 1867 the formerly independent Hammersmith and City Railway was absorbed by the Metropolitan Railway and the Great Western Railway, and was operated from then on by Metropolitan Railway trains. The plan for a terminus in Fulham was abandoned, and the line instead turned west at Hammersmith to run over London and South Western Railway tracks to Richmond. Although Wandsworth Town railway station, near the southern end of the bridge, had provided direct connections to central London since 1846, the lack of rail connections opening on the north bank meant the area on the Fulham side remained undeveloped, and bridge usage was low. Tolmé's design was not sturdy enough to carry heavy vehicles, and drainage problems on the approach road to the north discouraged vehicles from using Wandsworth Bridge.

Public ownership

Wandsworth Bridge never raised enough toll revenue to cover the costs of repairs and maintenance. In 1877 the Metropolis Toll Bridges Act was passed, and in 1880 Wandsworth Bridge, along with other London bridges, was taken into the public ownership of the Metropolitan Board of Works. Despite having run at a loss throughout its lifetime, the Board of Works paid £53,313 (about £ in ) for the bridge, a substantial premium on its £40,000 construction cost. On 26 June 1880 Edward, Prince of Wales, and Alexandra, Princess of Wales, presided over a ceremony abolishing tolls over the three bridges.

By the time it was taken into public ownership, the bridge was in very poor condition. In 1891 a weight limit of 5 tons was introduced, and in 1897 a  speed limit was imposed. With its narrowness and weight restrictions, by this point it was effectively a footbridge. As narrowness and weight restrictions meant that it was unable to carry buses, in 1926 a Royal Commission recommended its replacement and the London County Council agreed to finance a new bridge on the site. In 1928 it was decided instead to give priority to widening the much busier Putney Bridge, and the replacement of Wandsworth Bridge was delayed.

1940 bridge
In 1935, the Ministry of Transport agreed to finance 60 percent of the projected £503,000 (about £ in ) cost of a replacement bridge, and the London County Council approved a new design, by Sir Thomas Peirson Frank, for a three-span steel cantilever bridge  in width, allowing two lanes of traffic in each direction, and designed to allow widening to  if necessary. The design featured distinctive low curves, intended to reflect the low riverbanks in the area. The design was presented to the Royal Fine Art Commission for approval, with a covering note stating that "in the design of the bridge a severe simplicity of treatment has been carried out, expressed in a technique essentially related to the material proposed for its construction". Although the Commission expressed concern that the bridge might be too narrow, the design was approved. The work was put out for tender, with a stipulation that all materials used in the construction of the new bridge should be of British origin or manufacture.

The contract for the new bridge was awarded to Messrs Holloway Brothers (London), and work began in 1937. A temporary footbridge that had been used during the redevelopment of Chelsea Bridge between 1935 and 1937 was re-erected alongside Wandsworth Bridge, and the existing bridge demolished. The new bridge was expected to be complete in 1939; however, a shortage of steel in the buildup to the Second World War delayed its opening until 25 September 1940. The steel panels cladding the bridge were painted in varying shades of blue to camouflage it from German and Italian air raids, a colour scheme it retains today. Although it is one of London's busiest bridges, carrying over 50,000 vehicles per day, its drab colour scheme and minimalist design have led to it being described as "probably the least noteworthy bridge in London".

Later developments

Historically, the southern approach roads had been in poor condition and confusing to use. In 1969 the Greater London Council built the A214 road, a three-lane dual carriageway linking the southern end of Wandsworth Bridge to Tooting. At the immediate southern end of the bridge is a large roundabout adjacent to Wandsworth Town railway station, where Bridgend Road (A217), York Road (A3205), Swandon Way (A217) and Trinity Road (A214) meet. The roundabout is a noted example of 1960s modernist design, and served as the setting for parts of A Clockwork Orange in 1971. In 2007 approval was granted  for a series of  glass cone-shaped "flames" designed by architect Steven Lenczner, which would change colour with the tides, to be added to the bridge deck. The cost, estimated at £800,000, would be raised by private sponsorship. The "flames" were to be raised above the sightlines of drivers to avoid causing a distraction.

Wandsworth Bridge now marks the boundary above which a lower speed limit on the Thames is enforced.

See also
 List of lattice girder bridges in the United Kingdom
 List of crossings of the River Thames
 List of bridges in London

Notes and references

Notes

References

 Bibliography

 
 
 
 
 
 
 

Bridges in London
Buildings and structures in the London Borough of Hammersmith and Fulham
History of the London Borough of Hammersmith and Fulham
Buildings and structures in the London Borough of Wandsworth
Bridges across the River Thames
Bridges completed in 1940
Transport in the London Borough of Hammersmith and Fulham
Transport in the London Borough of Wandsworth
Former toll bridges in England
Fulham
1940 establishments in England